The Diocese of Santa Clara is a diocese of the Latin Church of the Roman Catholic Church in Cuba. The diocese is a suffragan of the Archdiocese of Camagüey. Originally erected as part of the Diocese of Cienfuegos in 1903, the parent diocese was renamed to the Diocese of Cienfuegos-Santa Clara in 1971. Finally in 1995 the parent diocese was split to form the Diocese of Cienfuegos and the Diocese of Santa Clara.

Bishops

Ordinaries
Fernando Ramon Prego Casal (1995 – 1999)
Marcelo Arturo González Amador (1999 – present)

Auxiliary bishop
Marcelo Arturo González Amador (1998-1999), appointed Bishop here

External links and references

Santa Clara
Santa Clara
Santa Clara
Roman Catholic Ecclesiastical Province of Camagüey